Ostrovskaya is a rural locality (a village) in Morozovskoye Rural Settlement, Verkhovazhsky District, Vologda Oblast, Russia. The population was 8 as of 2002.

Geography 
Ostrovskaya is located 35 km west of Verkhovazhye (the district's administrative centre) by road. Bushnitskaya is the nearest rural locality.

References 

Rural localities in Verkhovazhsky District